Carvalhal Benfeito is one of twelve civil parishes (freguesias) in the municipality of Caldas da Rainha, Portugal.

Villages 

Santana
Cabeça-Alta
Cruzes
Antas
Barrocas
Quinta do Bravo
Osseira
Eiras
Oliveirinha
Casal Fialho
Casal Pinheiro
Casal dos Carvalhos
Casal das Ladeiras
Hortas
Mestras
Vale da Vaca
Casal Novo
Vale das Cuvas
Casal da Azenha

References

Freguesias of Caldas da Rainha